Ian Wallace was the pen name of American science-fiction author John Wallace Pritchard (1912–1998).

Introduction

Ian Wallace was born in Chicago, Illinois but spent most of his life living in and around Detroit, Michigan.  Wallace was a practicing clinical psychologist for many years, and also had an extensive background in education.  Much of his career was spent working for the Detroit public schools system.

Wallace's mystery and adventure novels were generally set deep in the future, and often included characters with superhuman or telepathic abilities.

Bibliography

Notes

External links

1912 births
1998 deaths
Writers from Chicago
20th-century American novelists
American male novelists
American science fiction writers
20th-century American male writers
Novelists from Illinois